Mystery House may refer to:

 Mystery House, an Apple II computer game
 Mystery House (film), a 1938 American film
 Mystery House (radio drama), an American radio drama series
 Winchester Mystery House, a California tourist attraction